The 2015 WNBA season is the 17th season for the Minnesota Lynx of the Women's National Basketball Association. The Lynx became the third franchise to win three titles.

Transactions

WNBA Draft

Trades and roster changes

Roster

Season standings

Schedule
Minnesota Lynx 2015 Schedule - Lynx Home and Away - ESPN

Preseason

Playoffs

Statistics

Regular season

Awards and honors

After winning their third WNBA championship this season, the Lynx were honored with a private party hosted by renowned Minnesota music legend Prince at his Chanhassen home.

References

External links
The Official Site of the Minnesota Lynx

Minnesota Lynx seasons
Minnesota
Minnesota Lynx
Women's National Basketball Association championship seasons
Western Conference (WNBA) championship seasons